Chernomorovsky is a rural locality (a khutor) in Shebalinovskoye Rural Settlement, Oktyabrsky District, Volgograd Oblast, Russia. The population was 174 as of 2010. There are 4 streets.

Geography 
Chernomorovsky is located on the Myshkova River, 44 km northwest of Oktyabrsky (the district's administrative centre) by road. Shebalino is the nearest rural locality.

References 

Rural localities in Oktyabrsky District, Volgograd Oblast